Come Dine with Me is a British reality series that has aired on Channel 4 since 10 January 2005 and is narrated by Dave Lamb. As of July 2020, there have been 45 series.

Format
The show features five amateur chefs who live in the same town or area, who each host a three-course dinner party for the other contestants at their own home. Each competitor then rates the host's food and hosting skills during the taxi journey home, with the highest-scoring chef winning £1,000 cash. The show often features guests with clashing personalities.

The episodes featuring the same group of chef contestants are broadcast in sequence. Early series included groups of four chefs rather than five.

Dave Lamb provides a voiceover which sometimes includes sarcastic comments on the chefs' food and interior design.

A 2016 episode attracted particular attention, when contestant Peter Marsh made ungracious remarks upon losing to the winning contestant Jane. He said to her and the other contestants: "What a sad little life, Jane. Enjoy the money. I hope now you will spend it on getting some lessons in grace and decorum, because you have all the grace of a reversing dump truck without any tyres on."

Another episode gained attention online, when a clip on video sharing site YouTube of contestant Kev Riley fitting a balloon whisk into his mouth went viral. In an 'ask me anything' session on Reddit in 2022, Kev claimed that this was the result of a "spur of the moment" decision intended to make the producer laugh. This clip has had over 100m views on various threads across social media. This has resulted in the sale of merchandise,  flags appearing at Glastonbury and Kev being a regular contributor on Cameo.

From 2020, due to COVID-19, all five contestants cooked and in the same house; this is instead of having the contestants visiting each others houses to dine. The location of the house would vary depending on which city the five episodes were taking place.

Couples Come Dine with Me
On 7 July 2014, the first episode of the spin-off series - Couples Come Dine with Me, premiered on Channel 4. The series uses a similar format to the original series but features three couples competing to win £1000.

Celebrity Come Dine with Me
There have been occasional celebrity groups of chefs since Series 2.

Come Dine With Me: The Professionals
On 12 January 2022, Channel 4 commissioned Come Dine With Me: The Professionals. The series premiered on 27 June 2022 on Channel 4.

International versions

English

Spanish

Other languages

Notes

References

External links
 
 
 

2000s British game shows
2010s British game shows
2020s British game shows
2000s British cooking television series
2010s British cooking television series
2020s British cooking television series
2005 British television series debuts
Channel 4 game shows
Cooking competitions in the United Kingdom
English-language television shows
Come Dine With Me
Hospitality industry in the United Kingdom
Television series by ITV Studios